Risk is a  2007 Indian Hindi-language action thriller film directed by Vishram Sawant. It stars Vinod Khanna, Randeep Hooda, Tanushree Dutta, Zakir Hussain, Yashpal Sharma and Anant Jog in the lead roles. The movie is based on the Mumbai underworld. Randeep Hooda plays the role of an honest cop, Suryakant Satam, fighting against the might of a Bangkok-based don (crime lord) Khalid Bin Jamal, played by Vinod Khanna. The music is provided by Bapi-Tutul, Akbar Sami and Sandesh Shandilya, and the lyrics are by Sandeep Nath, Amitabh Verma and Sudhir. The background score is by Amar Mohile.
This film was remade in Telugu as Mahankali (2011) starring Dr. Rajasekhar, Madhurima and Pradeep Rawat.

Plot
For years, Khalid Bin Jamal has ruled the Mumbai crime underworld by staying in Bangkok, Thailand. Despite his distance from Mumbai, Khalid is able to control the Mumbai underworld by keeping the ruling members of his network, very close to him. He is extremely ruthless and shows no hesitation or remorse, towards his enemies.

The Indian police have been trying for years to extradite Khalid to India, but in vain. Inspector Suryakant has been in the police force for some time and has been keeping track of Khalid's activities. He makes up his mind to put an end to Khalid's criminal empire and bring Khalid to justice. To do so, he starts carrying out encounters against Jamal's henchmen. Over the course of a few weeks, Khalid's network suffers, as his men are simply killed in encounters and raids by Suryakant, who is supported by DCP Uttam Bhandari. 

Khalid becomes increasingly alarmed, but comes up with a counter-plan. He arranges for one of his leading associates, the politician Devki Wardhan, to be attacked, while Suryakant is arresting her. Her opponent, the Home Minister A. R. Sarang has been known to be in favour with Suryakant, and is blackmailed by Khalid, into open-firing on Devki Wardhan. This implicates Suryakant as being an accomplice, to Devki Wardhan's attempted murder, as two of Devki's men are shot dead by Suryakant. Soon, a string of allegations that include taking bribes from different crime lords, is formed against Suryakant. His plan to capture Khalid with bold moves thus backfires, because of Khalid's premeditated scheme.

The Police Commissioner is close to Devki Wardhan and is against Suryakant and tries all the time to suppress him. Suryakant's girlfriend, Shraddha, also does not support him and distances herself from him, due to his involvement with the underworld. Eventually, Suryakant is jailed. He receives messages from Khalid. He is offered back his police officer position, by Khalid, as long as he does his bidding for him. He is also handsomely rewarded, financially. Suryakant starts working energetically for Khalid and wipes out Khalid's sworn enemy, S.P. Naidu's men. Arbaaz, Khalid's hot-headed brother, smells a rat and suspects the designs of Suryakant. He travels to India with Hari, without informing Khalid, to personally deal with Naidu. Arbaaz, along with Hari and Suryakant, go to Naidu, to finish him. He is killed by Arbaaz, but Suryakant reveals his true colours, by killing Arbaaz, Hari, and Home Minister A. R. Sarang. He makes it appear as if Arbaaz had murdered Sarang and Hari.

The supposed death of a Home Minister, at the hands of Khalid's brother, is enough to have Khalid extradited to Mumbai, for trial. However, despite all of Suryakant's painstaking uncovering of Khalid's illicit activities, the Indian police cannot make a firm case against him. Moreover, Khalid heavily bribes the police prosecutor, in his favour. Khalid is sure his case will be dismissed by the Court, and that he will leave India in a day, but before doing so, he wants retribution for Arbaaz's death and orders his men to dispose of Suryakant's comrades in the police force. Shraddha realizes her folly of not being supportive to Suryakant and asks for his apology. Suryakant is told that Shraddha's life is in danger and that she will be killed by Khalid's men. He decides to take the last stand, and sends Shraddha safely, out of the country.

Khalid sends a message for Suryakant to meet him in jail. Before Suryakant has a chance to find out about the murders of DCP Bhandari, Inspector Shridhar and his other close colleagues, Khalid, himself, tells him that he killed them, during their meeting. He also tells Suryakant, that he will go free, despite everything he has done. Suryakant is shocked by the revelation and decides to eliminate Khalid. He storms the heavily guarded jail, where Khalid is being held, and manages to kill him, though he is mortally wounded. Upon seeing Khalid's lifeless body, he smiles.

Cast
Randeep Hooda as Suryakant Satam
Vinod Khanna as Khalid Bin Jamal:  Biggest don (ruler) of the crime-ridden Mumbai underworld.
Yashpal Sharma as Arbaaz Bin Jamal:  The hot-tempered brother of Khalid.
Zakir Hussain as S.P. Naidu:  A rival gang leader of Khalid's.
Anant Jog as A.R. Sarang:  Home-minister of Mumbai.  He has many underworld connections.
Seema Biswas as Devki Wardhan: associate of Khalid's.  She is heavily involved in politics.
Tanushree Dutta as Shraddha:  Suryakant's Girlfriend.
Ganesh Yadav as Inspector Shridhar:  Suryakant's superior and an honest officer.
D. Santosh as Khalid Jamal's mentally challenged son.
Makarand Deshpande as Hari, Khaled's man.
Shivkumar Subramaniam as DCP Uttam Bhandari.
Chetan Pandit as Devki's lawyer.
Murari Kumar as a goon.
Madhuri Bhagwat as Suryakant's mother.
Pradeep Velankar as Police Commissioner
Also in the cast are Suhas Palshikar, Rajendra Sethi and Ashraful Haq,

Soundtrack
The music was composed by Akbar Sami, Bapi–Tutul, Sandesh Shandilya and released by Home Records Audio.

Further reading

External links
 

2007 films
2000s Hindi-language films
Indian action thriller films
Indian police films
2007 action thriller films
Fictional portrayals of the Maharashtra Police
Films set in Mumbai
Films set in Bangkok
Films shot in Bangkok